Gauley Mills is an unincorporated community in Webster County, West Virginia, United States. Gauley Mills is located on the Gauley River, east of Camden-on-Gauley.

The community was so named on account of there being a sawmill on the Gauley River near the original town site.

References

Unincorporated communities in Webster County, West Virginia
Unincorporated communities in West Virginia